Joel 1 is the first chapter of the Book of Joel in the Hebrew Bible or the Old Testament of the Christian Bible. This book contains the prophecies attributed to the prophet Joel from the seventh century BCE, and is a part of the Book of the Twelve Minor Prophets.

Text
The original text was written in Hebrew language. This chapter is divided into 20 verses.

Textual witnesses
Some early manuscripts containing the text of this chapter in Hebrew are of the Masoretic Text tradition, which includes the Codex Cairensis (895 CE), the Petersburg Codex of the Prophets (916), Aleppo Codex (10th century), Codex Leningradensis (1008). Fragments containing parts of this chapter in Hebrew were found among the Dead Sea Scrolls, including 4Q78 (4QXIIc; 75–50 BCE) with extant verses 10–20; and 4Q82 (4QXIIg; 25 BCE) with extant verses 12–14.

Ancient manuscripts in Koine Greek containing this chapter are mainly of the Septuagint version, including Codex Vaticanus (B; B; 4th century), Codex Sinaiticus (S; BHK: S; 4th century), Codex Alexandrinus (A; A; 5th century) and Codex Marchalianus (Q; Q; 6th century).

A call to mourning (1:1–12)

Verse 1
The word of the Lord that came to Joel the son of Pethuel.
The name "Joel" means "one to whom Jehovah is God," that is, "worshipper of Jehovah". The prophet seems to have belonged to Judah, as no reference occurs to Israel; whereas he speaks of Jerusalem, the temple, the priests, and the ceremonies, as if he were intimately familiar with them (compare ).

Verse 4

Hebrew text

Transliteration

Cross reference: Joel 2:25.

Exact identity of these locusts is unknown, whether they represents "four varieties of insect" or "four various stages in the insect development" or "vernacular differences".

See also
 Related Bible parts: Deuteronomy 28, 1 Kings 8, Psalm 78, Psalm 105, Psalm 109, Isaiah 33, Joel 2, Amos 4, Nahum 3

References

Sources

External links

Jewish translations:
 Yoel – Joel chapter 1 (Judaica Press) translation with Rashi's commentary at Chabad.org
Christian translations:
Online Bible at GospelHall.org (ESV, KJV, Darby, American Standard Version, Bible in Basic English)
  Various versions

01